Andy Towle  is an American writer, publisher, and media commentator based in Provincetown, Massachusetts.

Background 
Towle holds two Bachelor of Arts degrees from Vassar College in Art History and English. He was awarded the 1989 W.K. Rose Fellowship in the Creative Arts from Vassar College, a Wallace Stegner graduate fellowship from 1989 to 1991 from Stanford University, and two writing fellowships, one in poetry and one in fiction, from the Fine Arts Work Center in Provincetown, Massachusetts. While in Provincetown he produced poetry, and worked as a pool boy and a bartender at The Boatslip. After moving to New York in 1992, he became a bartender and later a manager at the 1990s Chelsea gay bar Splash. He returned to New York in 2005 after moving around, first in Hong Kong (where he was for several years partnered with Amazing Race winner Chip Arndt) then Los Angeles. He currently lives in Provincetown, Massachusetts.

Career 

From 1998 to 2002, Towle served as the editor in chief of Genre magazine, a North American gay men's lifestyle publication, and editor at large for The Out Traveler, an American gay travel quarterly.

Towle's poetry appeared in The Yale Review (May 1991), Ploughshares (Winter 1992–93), The Paris Review in 2000, and in Poetry Magazine (July 1988, November 1988, February 1991, May 1997, and July 1999).

Towle founded the website Towleroad in 2003. The site focuses on LGBTQ news and entertainment. In 2005, OUT magazine co-founder Michael Goff became his business partner. Since 2014, Towle and Goff have also published Ptown Hacks, a travel guide to Provincetown.

See also
 LGBT culture in New York City
 List of LGBT people from New York City
 New Yorkers in journalism
 Poetry analysis

References

External links
 Towleroad.com

American bloggers
American magazine editors
American gay writers
Living people
LGBT people from New York (state)
20th-century American journalists
American male journalists
21st-century American non-fiction writers
American male bloggers
Year of birth missing (living people)
21st-century American LGBT people